Otištino is a village in the municipality of Čaška, North Macedonia.

Demographics
In the 1960s there was 1 Muslim Albanian household in the village.

According to the 2021 census, the village had a total of 39 inhabitants. Ethnic groups in the village include:

Albanians 22
Bosniaks 17

References

Villages in Čaška Municipality
Albanian communities in North Macedonia